Tomils is a former municipality in the district of Hinterrhein in the Swiss canton of Graubünden. It was formed on 1 January 2009 through the merger of Feldis/Veulden, Scheid, Trans and Tumegl/Tomils.  On 1 January 2015 the former municipalities of Almens, Paspels, Pratval, Rodels and Tomils merged to form the new municipality of Domleschg.

Demographics
Tomils had a population (as of 2013) of 717.

Dreibündenstein

The Dreibündenstein (|Romanish: Term bel) is a marker erected at the intersection of the Three Leagues (League of God's House, the League of the Ten Jurisdictions and the Grey League) which would found the modern canton of Graubünden.

The original stone dates from 1722, and today is in the Rätian Museum in Chur.  In 1742, Nicolin Sererhard mentions three stones.  The Sektion Rhätia (Rhätian Section) of the Swiss Alpine club built this  stone marker  in 1915. A chairlift was added to mountain in 1970, improving access to the marker.

References

External links

 Official website 

Former municipalities of Graubünden
Populated places disestablished in 2015
2015 disestablishments in Switzerland
Domleschg